Dear Happy is the third studio album by English singer-songwriter Gabrielle Aplin. It was released on 17 January 2020, through Aplin's own label Never Fade Records, and distribution group AWAL. Dear Happy marks Aplin's first studio-length release since her second studio album Light Up the Dark (2015). The album was announced through Aplin's Twitter and website on 10 September 2019. Aplin will tour in support of the record in early 2020.

Background
Aplin said the album began "with the moment I made a definitive decision to start to unravel and rewire my brain", calling it "a past, present and future letter to myself". A press release described Dear Happy as an "uplifting pop record that chronicles Gabrielle's life, and the experiences and cultures she has been inspired by whilst touring and travelling the world over the past couple of years".

Critical reception

Jessie Cunniffe of The Sydney Morning Herald awarded the album five stars out five and deemed it "an intricate portrait of the bruises and realisations of the aftermath of [any quarter-life crisis] phase". Gigwises Tommy Monroe praised the album's "deep lyrics, emotive vocals and catchy hooks". In a mixed review, The Independents Annabel Nugent highlighted how the album was "expertly engineered for pop virality" but criticized its "saccharine" moments.

Track listing

Charts

References

2020 albums
Gabrielle Aplin albums
Albums produced by Ash Howes
Albums produced by Askjell
Albums produced by Gabrielle Aplin
Albums produced by Mike Spencer
Albums produced by Seton Daunt
Albums produced by Tommy Baxter (musician)